Cora Reynolds Anderson (April 10, 1882March 11, 1950) was an American politician who served in the Michigan House of Representatives as a member of the Republican Party. She was the first woman and Native American elected to the Michigan House of Representatives.

Early life

Cora Reynolds Anderson was born on April 10, 1882, in L'Anse, Michigan, to Robert B. Reynolds and Madeline Bachand. She was of English, French, and Chippewa descent. She was a member of the first graduating class of L'Anse High School. In 1903, she married Charles Harold Anderson.

Michigan House of Representatives

Elections

In 1924, Anderson won the Republican nomination in the Iron district and won in the general election without opposition to succeed Patrick H. O'Brien. She was the first woman and Native American to serve in the Michigan House of Representatives. Anderson was inaugurated on November 4, 1924.

On April 28, 1926, Anderson announced at a meeting of the Michigan Federation of Republican Women's clubs that she would seek reelection. During the campaigned she urged other women to seek election to political offices. On July 28, she filed to renomination as the Republican candidate, but was defeated in the primary by William C. Birk. No other women were nominated by the Republican Party during the 1926 elections. In the general election Birk won and Anderson left office on January 7, 1925.

Tenure

In 1925, Speaker Fred B. Wells appointed Anderson as chair of the committee on the industrial school for girls at Adrian, Michigan. During the fifty-third session of the Michigan House of Representatives from 1925 to 1926 she served on the Agriculture, Insurance, and Northern State Normal School committees.

On September 9, 1925, Anderson was selected to serve as vice president of the Republican Women's Federation of Michigan. From January 5 to 6, 1926, she served as a delegate, as one of the first women to do so, representing Michigan at the Great Lakes-St. Lawrence tidewater congress.

Later life and legacy

Anderson died on March 11, 1950, in Pentland Township, Michigan.

On December 19, 2000, the Anderson House Office Building (the office building for Michigan state House members) was named in her honor. In 2001, she was inducted into the Michigan Women's Hall of Fame. In 2022, a bill to name the post office located at 404 US-41 North in Baraga County, Michigan the “Cora Reynolds Anderson Post Office” was signed into law.

See also
Eva McCall Hamilton - first woman to serve in the Michigan Senate

References

1882 births
1950 deaths
Native American women in politics
Native American state legislators
Women state legislators in Michigan
Republican Party members of the Michigan House of Representatives
20th-century American women politicians
20th-century American politicians
20th-century Native American women
20th-century Native Americans
Native American history of Michigan